Tugayevo (Tuğay) is a rural locality (a village) in Utyakovsky Selsoviet, Gafuriysky District, Bashkortostan, Russia. The population was 270 as of 2010. There are 9 streets.

Geography 
Tugayevo is located 21 km southwest of Krasnousolsky (the district's administrative centre) by road. Yangi-Yurt is the nearest rural locality.

References 

Rural localities in Gafuriysky District